Lovisa Jewellery is an Australian jewellery chain founded in Sydney in April 2010. This fast fashion jewellery brand was launched by Australian billionaire Brett Blundy, the former chairman of BB Retail Capital (BBRC). As of November 2022, Lovisa has 746 stores across 32 countries including Australia, New Zealand, Malaysia, Singapore, South Africa, Spain, France and the United States. Lovisa also has franchised stores in the Middle East and Vietnam.

History 
Shane Fallscheer, the managing director and executive director of Lovisa partnered with Brett Blundy's private investment company BBRC in 2010 to establish this fast-fashion specialty jewellery chain.  The brand concept for Lovisa was envisioned to be an extension of BBRC's existing jewellery brand, Diva. 

Lovisa announced its acquisition of the European retail store network of German jewellery wholesaler Beeline GmbH in November 2020.

References

External links

Jewellery companies of Australia
Jewellery retailers of Australia
Companies based in Sydney
Retail companies established in 2010
Australian companies established in 2010